Nathan Peter Larson (born September 12, 1970) is an American guitarist, singer, songwriter, and author. He came to prominence in the 1990s as the guitarist for the rock group Shudder to Think. He has since worked on many film score compositions. He is married to Nina Persson, the lead singer of the Swedish rock band The Cardigans, and the couple have collaborated on several musical projects.

Larson is responsible for arranging 12-hour experimental music concert events, and is one of the founders of the LUMEN PROJECT. 
 
In May 2011, Larson's debut novel, The Dewey Decimal System, was published by Akashic Books. The second book in the series was published summer 2012, and is entitled The Nervous System. The third and final installment in this series, The Immune System, was published in 2015.

Music career
Maryland-born Larson was the lead guitarist for the 1990s band Shudder to Think, and the original bassist for the hardcore punk band Swiz. Larson was also the creative force behind the group Mind Science of the Mind, and founder of the band Hot One.

Larson and his wife Nina Persson have also been frequent musical collaborators, Persson providing vocals on several of Larson's film soundtracks, and Larson being a member of Persson's A Camp project and of the band on her solo album Animal Heart. Larson is also credited as co-writer of several songs on The Cardigans' 2005 album (and last to date), Super Extra Gravity.

He has produced albums for The Ark, Angela McCluskey's THE THINGS WE DO (Manhattan / Blue Note), among other work.

Larson is one of the co-founders of the Subchamber Ensmble, an experimental chamber music group.

In 2017, he was a co-founder of the international nonprofit LUMEN PROJECT,  which creates 6-24 hour audio and visual experiences.

In addition to his work with "drone music" concerts, Larson is also a prolific film composer and has contributed to over 60 scores, as well as music for such series as HBO's VINYL and Show Me a Hero.

Select discography
 Solo
 Jealous God (Artemis Records, 2001)
 FilmMusik (Commotion Records, 2004)

 With Shudder to Think 
 Your Choice Live Series (Your Choice Records, 1992)
 Pony Express Record (Big Cat UK Records, 1994)
 50,000 B.C. (Sony Music, 1997)
 High Art (Velvel Records, 1998)
 First Love, Last Rites (1998)

 With Mind Science of the Mind 
 Mind Science of the Mind (Sony Music, 1996)

 With A Camp
 A Camp (Stockholm Records, 2001)
 Colonia (Universal Records, 2009)

 With Hot One 
 Hot One (Modern Imperial Records, 2006)

 Film scores

 1998: Velvet Goldmine (contributed songs with Shudder To Think)
 1999: Boys Don't Cry
 2000: Tigerland
 2002: Malcolm
 2002: Lilja 4-ever
 2002: Storytelling
 2002: Le Chateau
 2003: Mannen som log
 2003: The Deal
 2003: Dirty Pretty Things
 2004: The Woodsman
 2004: Prozac Nation
 2004: A Love Song for Bobby Long
 2005: Little Fish
 2005: Palindromes
 2008: Choke
 2008: August
 2008: Yes Madam, Sir
 2009: Like Dandelion Dust
 2009: The Messenger
 2010: American Mystic
 2010: Trust
 2011: Margin Call
 2011: Choose
 2011: Our Idiot Brother
 2011: Silent House
 2013: Emanuel and the Truth About Fishes
 2014: God's Pocket
 2014: The Skeleton Twins
 2017: Saturday Church
 2018: Juliet, Naked
 2020: High Fidelity (TV series)

Personal life
Larson is married to The Cardigans lead singer, Nina Persson. They wed in Malmö, Sweden. They have a son named Nils who was born on September 30, 2010. The couple formerly resided in New York City in the Manhattan neighborhood of Harlem, but currently reside in Malmö, Sweden. He was previously engaged to actress and musician Kerri Kenney-Silver.

Awards
 GRAS SAVOYE Award at Cannes 2004 for THE WOODSMAN score
 the Georges Delerue Prize for the Best Music, Ghent Film Festival 2009, Belgium for A RATIONAL SOLUTION
 Movieline's Young Hollywood Award for Best song in a motion picture (Velvet Goldmine)
 Produced Emmy-award winning song for Nickelodeon's "Nickellinium”
 The Deal received the BAFTA award for Best Television Drama

References

External links

 
 Lumen Project events
 Larson interview regarding Lumen Project
 The Dewey Decimal System at akashic books : plot summary and review blurbs
 The Dewey Decimal System at A Camp : plot summary

1970 births
American film score composers
American male guitarists
American punk rock guitarists
American rock guitarists
Georges Delerue Award winners
Guitarists from Maryland
Living people
American male film score composers
Shudder to Think members
The 8G Band members
The Field School alumni
American emigrants to Sweden
A Camp members